Rengali Dam Projectship is a census town in Anugul district in the Indian state of Odisha.

Geography

Demographics
 India census, Rengali Dam Projectship had a population of 8115. Males constitute 54% of the population and females 46%. Rengali Dam Projectship has an average literacy rate of 77%, higher than the national average of 59.5%: male literacy is 83%, and female literacy is 70%. In Rengali Dam Projectship, 9% of the population is under 6 years of age.

References

Cities and towns in Angul district